Cadwallon is a role-playing game (RPG) published by Rackham in book form in 2006. It is set in the fantasy world of Rackham's previous game Confrontation. A tactical role-playing game, it is played with miniatures. As with most of Rackham's products, Cadwallon was originally written in French and later translated into English and Spanish.

Setting
Cadwallon is the name of the large city in which the role-playing game is set. The city was founded by a mercenary company and is reputedly free from the surrounding nations' politics which mainly concern the massive war called The Rag'narok. The city is divided in two parts; the upper city and the lower city, which are further divided into eleven fiefdoms, each with its own peer. The whole city is ruled by the Duke.

The City is built on the ruins of several different civilizations including the Cynwall and Acheron but with its foundations in some much older culture.

System
Cadwallon has a custom ruleset for generating characters. Characters are from among the races in the Confrontation universe, namely elves, dwarves, humans, goblins, orcs, ogres and wolfen. They also belong to one of the cultures which are waging war on the continent taking the form of the factions' totems. A character can also originate from Cadwallon itself being from either the Upper or lower district 

Cadwallon has a custom system where pools of six-sided dice are used when determining the success of actions.  An oddity in Cadwallon are the names chosen for the character attributes.  Rather than utilize traits such as strength and dexterity Cadwallon uses words that are in common use other places in Confrontation fluff like Pugnacity and Style.

External links
 RPG.net review
  Article on the Guide du rôliste galactique
  fan site

Fantasy role-playing games
French role-playing games
Role-playing games introduced in 2006